This is a list of Bulgarian generals from the period of the Principality (1878–1908) and Kingdom (1908–1946). The year each became a general is given in parentheses.

List

A
Abadzhiev, Georgi — Major General (1913)
Avramov, Ivan — Major General (1921)
Agura, Georgi — Major General (1900)
Azmanov, Stefan — Major General (1918)
Atanasov, Rashko — Major General (1935)

B
Bakardzhiev, Nikola — Infantry General (1934)
Balabanov, Boncho — Major General (1900)
Balkanski, Milenko — Major General (1917)
Batsarov, Ivan — Major General (1917)
Belov, Stefan — Major General (1917)
Blaskov, Andrey — Major General (1904)
Bonchev, Ivan — Major General (1918)
Bogdanov, Stefan — Lieutenant General (1920)
Botev, Kiril — Lieutenant General (1912)
Bocharov, Stefan — Major General (c. 1910)
Bochev, Nikola — Major General (1900)
Boshnakov, Georgi — Major General (1918)
Boyadzhiev, Kliment — Lieutenant General (1915)
Bradistilov, Stoyu — Lieutenant General (1917)
Burmov, Hristo — Lieutenant General (1936)
Barnev, Panayot — Lieutenant General (1918)
Boydev, Vasili — Lieutenant General (1939)

C
Charakchiev, Hristo — Major General (1917)

D
Davidov, Aleksandar — Major General (1925)
Daskalov, Teodosi — Infantry General (1942)
Delov, Vasil — Major General (1913)
Dikov, Vicho — Lieutenant General (1913)
Dimitriev, Iliya — Major General (1908)
Dimitriev, Radko — Lieutenant General (1912)
Dipchev, Ivan — Major General (1934)
Draganov, Yanko — Lieutenant General (1917)

F
Fichev, Ivan — Lieutenant General (1914)

G
Genchev, Nikola — Lieutenant General (1945)
Genev, Nikola — Major General (1904)
Georgiev, Konstantin — Major General (1920)
Georgiev, Todor — Lieutenant General (1934)
Geshev, Dimitar — Infantry General (1919)

H
Hadzhipetkov, Nikola — Lieutenant General (1940)
Hesapchiev, Hristofor — Major General (1910)
Hristov, Pavel — Infantry General (1917)
Hristov, Nikola - Lieutenant General (1944)

I
Ivanov, Georgi — Major General (1909)
Ivanov, Nikola — Infantry General (1936)
Ilyev, Stefan — Major General (1900)

K
Kantardzhiev, Todor — Lieutenant General (1917)
Ketskarov, Vladimir — Major General (1935)
Kirkov, Dimitar — Major General (1912)
Kirkov, Konstantin — Major General (1918)
Kiselov, Panteley — Infantry General (1920)
Kisyov, Aleksandar — General of the Cavalry (1931)
Kovachev, Stiliyan — Infantry General (1936)
Kolev, Ivan — Lieutenant General (1917)
Kolev, Krum — Major General (1944)
Krayovski, Stanislav — Major General (1935)
Krstev, Asen — Major General (1941)
Kutinchev, Vasil — Infantry General (1918)

L
Lazarov, Velizar — Infantry General (1929)
Lilkov, Hristo — Major General (1944)
Lolov, Petar — Major General (1917)
Lukash, Konstantin — Lieutenant General (1940)
Lukov, Ivan — Lieutenant General (1920)
Lukov, Hristo K. — Lieutenant General (1938)
Lukov, Hristo Ts. — Major General (1907)
Lyubomski, Stefan — Major General (1892)

M
Marinkov, Sotir — Lieutenant General (1933)
Marinov, Ivan — Lieutenant General (1944)
Marinov, Krastyu — Major General (1900)
Markov, Ivan — Major General (1919)
Markov, Ivan — Lieutenant General (1940)
Markov, Petar — Cavalry General (1918)
Markov, Todor — Major General (1917)
Marholev, Genko — Major General (1936)
Marchin, Georgi — Major General (1913)
Midilev, Petar — Major General (1930)
Mitov, Todor — Major General (1915)
Mikhov, Nikola — Lieutenant General (1942)
Mutkurov, Sava — Major General (1891)
Nam, My - Supreme Commander (1878)

N
Nakov, Nikola - Lieutenant General (1944)
Nazlamov, Atanas — Lieutenant General (1918)
Naydenov, Kalin — Lieutenant General (1917)
Nedev, Nikola — Major General (1935)
Nedyalkov, Hristo — Lieutenant General (1919)
Nerezov, Stefan — Infantry General (1920)
Nikiforov, Nikifor — Lieutenant General (1912)
Nikolaev, Danail — Infantry General (1909)
Nikolov, Asen N. — Major General (1917)
Nikolov, Kosta — Major General (1937)

P
Pakov, Hristo — Major General (1936)
Papadopov, Asen — Major General (1914)
Paprikov, Stefan — Lieutenant General (1908)
Peev, Yordan — Major General (1936)
Peev, Panayot — Major General (1905)
Pernikliyski, Dimitar — Major General (1917)
Petrov, Ivan — Major General (1917)
Petrov, Racho — Infantry General (1936)
Petrunov, Hristo — Major General (1900)
Pisarov, Nikola — Major General (1919)
Popdimitrov, Aleksander — Major General (1943)
Popov, Georgi — Artillery General (1941)
Popov, Ivan T. — Major General (1909)
Popov, Stefan — Major General (1918)
Popov, Hristo — Lieutenant General (1919)
Protogerov, Aleksandar — Lieutenant General (19??)
Pushkarov, Stoyan — Major General (1918)

R
Radev, Todor — Major General (1934)
Ribarov, Nikola — Lieutenant General (1917)
Rusev, Ivan — Major General (1917)
Rusev, Rusi — Artillery General (1944)
Ryaskov, Nikola — Major General (1905)

S
Savov, Sava — Infantry General (1919)
Savov, Mihail — Lieutenant General (1908)
Sapov, Georgi — Major General (1928)
Sapunarov, Mihail — Major General (1918)
Sarafov, Ivan — Major General (1905)
Shkoynov, Ivan — Major General (1919)
Sirakov, Asen — Major General (1943)
Sirakov, Radoy — Major General (1906)
Sirmanov, Ierotey — Major General (1918)
Slavkov, Raycho — Lieutenant General (1944)
Slavchev, Stefan — Lieutenant General (19??)
Solarov, Konstantin — Infantry General (1934)
Stanchev, Kiril — Lieutenant General (1944)
Stefanov, Atanas — Lieutenant General (1943)
Stoykov, Ivan — Major General (1917)
Stoychev, Vladimir — Lieutenant General (1944)
Stoychev, Nikola — Lieutenant General (1942)
Stoyanov, Vladimir — Major General (1925)
Stoyanov, Konstantin — Major General (1941)

T
Tabakov, Ivan — Major General (1918)
Tanev, Aleksandar — Lieutenant General (1918)
Tanintchev, Vladimir - Artillery Major General (1930)
Tanovski, Georgi — Major General (1936)
Tantilov, Petar — Lieutenant General (1918)
Tasev, Stefan — Major General (1917)
Tenev, Pravoslav — Infantry General (1918)
Todorov, Georgi — Infantry General (1917)
Topaldzhikov, Nikola — Major General (1923)
Toshev, Stefan — Infantry General (1917)
Trifonov, Trifon — Major General (1943)
Tsanev, Stefan — Lieutenant General (1936)
Tsenov, Panteley — Lieutenant General (1918)
Tserkovski, Vaklin — Major General (1907)
Tsonchev, Ivan — Major General (1901)
Tsaklev, Petko — Major General (1918)

U
Uzunski, Konstantin - Major General (unknown)
Urumov, Boyan - Major General (1938)

V
Vazov, Vladimir — Lieutenant General (1920)
Vazov, Georgi — Lieutenant General (1913)
Vasilev, Valko — Major General (1916)
Vatev, Anastas — Major General (1930)
Velchev, Damyan — Colonel General (1945)
Velchev, Valko — Major General (1901)
Venedikov, Yordan — Major General (1935)
Vinarov, Varban — Major General (1900)
Valkov, Ivan — Infantry General (1928)
Valnarov, Dimitar — Major General (1907)

Y
Yankov, Simeon — Major General (1910)
Yanchulev, Kiril — Major General (1943)
Yovov, Mihail — Major General (1933)

Z
Zagorski, Stoyan — Lieutenant General (1918)
Zafirov, Atila — Major General (1917)
Zaimov, Vladimir - Major General (1935)
Zhekov, Nikola — Infantry General (1936)
Zhelyavski, Nikola — Lieutenant General (1918)
Zhostov, Konstantin — Major General (1915)
Zlatarev, Krastyu — Lieutenant General (1919)
Zlatev, Pencho — Lieutenant General (1934)

References
Boina Slava Forums: List of the Bulgarian Generals  Accessed 2 January 2015. 
Boina Slava Forums: The Bulgarian Generals.  Accessed 2 January 2015. 

Military history of Bulgaria
Bulgaria, Kingdom
Generals in the Kingdom of Bulgaria
Bulgarian generals in the Kingdom of Bulgaria
Kingdom of Bulgaria